Architectural Heritage is an academic journal published by Edinburgh University Press on behalf of the Architectural Heritage Society of Scotland in November each year. It was founded in 1991. The journal focuses on architectural history and conservation articles covering all periods of building up to and including the recent past as well as book reviews and review essays.  It is the only peer reviewed publication on architectural heritage research in Scotland.

References

External links 

 
"Additions to historic buildings: between parasite and prosthetic architecture"
"Addition to historic building: A hermeneutic interpretation"

Edinburgh University Press academic journals
Architectural history journals
Publications established in 1990
Annual journals
English-language journals